Meghalaya Nationalist Congress Party a political party that existed in Meghalaya, India in December 2003. It was formed by Cyprian Sangma on December 15, when six out of 14 Nationalist Congress Party legislators broke away. Four of the six were immediately given cabinet berths in the D.D. Lapang government. On December 21 MNCP merged with the Indian National Congress.

MNCP was also the name of another NCP splinter group in the state, formed in 2001.

Defunct political parties in Meghalaya
2003 establishments in Meghalaya
Political parties established in 2003
Political parties disestablished in 2003
Nationalist Congress Party